Lucy Warner (born 7 June 1943) is a Canadian actress. She is known for her role as Emily Blair on the Canadian occult-supernatural soap opera Strange Paradise.

Biography
Lucy Warner, the daughter of American parents, attended London Central Collegiate Institute and London's Theatre School in Ontario. She started her professional acting career in 1959, after she was discovered at the amateur Ontario's London Little Theatre in 1958.

Warner's early television role was in a 1962 episode of Playdate, and occasional appearances in the soap drama Scarlett Hill soon followed. She also appeared in the film short Stand by for Life (1963) and had parts in Seaway and Festival. In 1969, she was cast for her most-remembered character, researcher Emily Blair in supernatural series "Strange Paradise".

Shortly afterward, Lucy left both Canada and the acting profession. She later relocated with her family to the South and worked for the University of Miami in Coral Gables, Florida.

Personal life
Lucy Warner married Nels Richard Nelson, a property developer and entrepreneur. In 2011, they retired to Delta, Colorado. Nels died on December 7, 2020.

Filmography

Film

Television

Stage

References

External links

1943 births
Living people
Canadian television actresses
American emigrants to Canada